Elizabeth Tanner (born 25 February 1970) is an Australian stage and television actress and theatre director best known for her roles as Bronwyn Craig in the television series All Saints and as Bridget Westfall in Wentworth.

Early life
Tanner grew up in Victoria, Australia, graduating from the University of Ballarat in 1993, with a Bachelor of Performing Arts. She has an older brother.

Career 
Tanner began her career in theatre and made several guest appearances on Victorian based productions before landing her first big role as Zoe Marshall in the short lived Channel 9 soap Pacific Drive from 1996 to 1997.

Tanner then moved to Sydney, Australia to pursue more acting opportunities and in 1998, began starring in the hospital drama All Saints as Bronwyn (Bron) Craig until she exited the series in 2003. Tanner's character was well received during her time on the show, winning Logie Awards for her role in 2002 and 2003.

In 2004, after returning to Victoria, she starred in the short lived television series Fireflies and then the Australian drama series headLand from 2005 to 2006.

From 2009 to 2011 she starred as Michelle LeTourneau in Rescue: Special Ops.

Since 2015 she has been a recurring character on the television series Wentworth, playing forensic psychologist Bridget Westfall. She appeared from seasons three to six, departing the series in 2018. 

Tanner has her own theatre company, Mad as Us.

Awards
During her run on All Saints, she gained a total of seven Logie nominations in categories including Most Popular New Female Talent and Most Outstanding Actress and Best Personality on Australian Television. Tanner won Most Popular Actress Logie Awards in 2002 and 2003 for her role as Bron.

Personal life
Tanner was previously in a relationship with All Saints co-star Brian Vriends with whom she shares a daughter. She has two other children.

She currently resides in Ballarat, Victoria.

Filmography

Film

Television

Theatre

References

External links
AustralianTelevision.net – All Saints profiles: Libby Tanner

1970 births
Actresses from Melbourne
Australian film actresses
Australian stage actresses
Australian television actresses
Federation University Australia alumni
Living people
Logie Award winners
20th-century Australian actresses
21st-century Australian actresses